Magicians is a 2007 British comedy film released on 18 May 2007. It stars comic duo Robert Webb and David Mitchell as stage magicians Karl and Harry. The two magicians compete together in a magic competition, despite their personal differences. Parts and ideas of the film have been taken to parody the 2006 film The Prestige by Christopher Nolan, though this had not been released when Magicians was filmed (though the original novel by Christopher Priest had been published in 1995). The film is directed by Andrew O'Connor and written by Jesse Armstrong and Sam Bain, who are also the writers of the Channel 4 sitcom Peep Show, which stars Mitchell and Webb. Other principal cast members include Jessica Hynes, Darren Boyd, Steve Edge, Peter Capaldi, and Andrea Riseborough.

Plot

Harry Kane and Karl Allen are best friends who work together in a successful and popular magic double act, with Harry's wife Carol working as their assistant. After one show, however, Harry discovers Karl and Carol backstage in a magic box having sex (during an agreement between Harry and the theatre owner about letting the act go on for 4 more weeks and letting them do an act on a cruise ship). During the next show, Carol is locked into a guillotine as part of a climatic trick, only for the blade to decapitate her; it is not immediately clear whether Harry, despite his protestations of innocence, has murdered her or whether she was the victim of a freak accident. Four years later, the act has broken up and the two friends – now bitter rivals – have gone their separate ways; Harry, having given up professional magic, is working in a Wilkinson hardware store, only to be fired after a customer complains when he creates an illusion of him cutting his arm severely with a knife blade during a sales pitch, whilst Karl is attempting to reinvent himself as a Derren Brown-esque magician called the Mindmonger, with limited success. During an unsuccessful impromptu-pitch at a television corporation, the only person he manages to impress is Dani, the tea girl, who Karl immediately gets a crush on much to the jealousy of his incompetent agent Otto, who nurses an unsubtle homosexual crush on him.

After numerous failed attempts at raising money, Harry sees a poster for the "Magic shield" competition held in Jersey, with a prize of £20,000, and decides to enter. Trying to find a new assistant, Harry is forced to recruit the only applicant, Linda, an old work friend whose only entertainment skill is a poor dancing routine. Harry swallows his pride and contacts Karl, who agrees to enter the competition with him; although their reputation in the magic community is still strong enough to get them into the tournament without an audition, the tensions between them ultimately prove too strong and they decide to go solo from that point on. As Harry and Linda rehearse their magic act, they begin to grow closer, but whilst Linda is open about her interest in Harry, he is too uptight and insecure to fully express his reciprocation. Much to his discomfort, Linda discovers the guillotine amongst his magic props and convinces him to use it as the centrepiece of the finale. Karl, meanwhile, is delighted to learn that Dani has come down from London to see him perform, but is slightly alarmed to discover that she believes him to be a genuine psychic. He nevertheless goes along with her belief, particularly as the interest in the competition has seen him approached by a television producer who wants to make him the centrepiece of a psychic show. Karl agrees to make his act for the finale a medium display, but begins to suffer a crisis of conscience. Karl tries a trick where he is buried in sand for a day.

Upon learning that Harry has not told Linda of what happened to his wife, Karl informs her. Harry panics when he discovers that her hotel room is vacant, believing she has returned to London. He conquers his fear of flying to immediately fly back to London, only to discover as soon as he gets there that she has merely switched rooms and forgotten to inform him. Managing to return to Jersey in time to compete by telling Linda to make one of the judges delay the act, both Harry and Karl make it through to the final; Linda claims that she is okay with hearing about what happened to Carol, but tensions between both begin to grow as she struggles to trust him. The night of the finale, Harry is heartbroken to learn that Linda has apparently slept with another magician, the sleazy and unethical Tony White; although Linda confirms it, she is lying in an attempt to force Harry to open up about his feelings, which he is still unable to do. Karl, meanwhile, finally prepares to consummate his relationship with Dani, but admits that he is not a true psychic after she thinks he is contacting her dead father, and betrayed, she shuns him.

That night, Karl and Harry have a confrontation backstage, in which Karl accuses Harry of murdering Carol; Harry angrily rejects the accusation and challenges that Karl merely finds it easier to believe that rather than accept the guilt of betraying his best friend. On stage, Karl begins to pioneer his psychic act, but the stooge he has hired in the crowd which he had chosen with a fake random ball toss, accidentally trips and concusses himself on the stage. Upon hearing the sad story of another selected audience member, he decides that he cannot perpetuate the fraud, admitting to the audience that he is not able to contact the dead. As a result, Dani forgives him. Harry, as 'The Black Widower', starts his guillotine act, but at the moment of truth Linda's nerve fails her and she flees the stage. Although Harry’s act would appear to be ruined when he asks if anybody else wants to try, Karl steps forward and announces that he will face the guillotine instead. Karl allows himself to be locked in the guillotine, explaining that Carol was frequently unfaithful and forced him to have sex with her (but was unable to achieve an erection when Harry had caught them). Harry appears to decapitate Karl – although it is merely an illusion, and Karl appears unharmed, the trick having worked perfectly. Harry wins the competition, and in his acceptance speech both forgives Karl and admits that he loves Linda, who joins him on stage and the two kiss. Their friendship mended, Karl and Harry embark on a reunion tour, incorporating Dani and Linda into the act as their assistants.

Cast 

The magic consultant for the film was Scott Penrose who also appears as Magibot.

Some of the U.K.'s leading real life magicians Aladin, Ali Bongo and Patrick Page make cameo appearances in the film.

Production 
The duo had not expected to star in a film at this point of their careers, with Mitchell stating that "it probably came much earlier than we thought we would do a film.  It landed very fortuitously on our doormat." At first, Mitchell and Webb were not considered for the roles of Harry and Karl, but O'Connor changed his mind "it became clear they could do these parts really well.  And we thought, well, wouldn't it be great to do our first movie with people we know, because we really admire and enjoy working with them". Unlike most other Mitchell and Webb projects, Olivia Colman does not have a main part in the film. O'Connor explained that "Olivia was part of the development and did some read-throughs with us.  I guess our feeling was that because of the relationship between [Mitchell and Webb] and Olivia in Peep Show, to have taken that same relationship, it would have been a really weird thing for the audience.  I must say I think she'd have been great in the part, she was great in the read-throughs, I just thought we couldn't have done that." Mitchell admitted, the day before the film's release, that he "really got into" his role as Harry.

Mitchell and Webb were taught basic magical skills for the film, with them each receiving "welcome pack of DVDs telling the history of magic". Andrew O'Connor was a member of The Magic Circle but was thrown out for revealing secrets, so he and Scott Penrose taught Mitchell and Webb magical skills. Whilst filming in Nottingham, unit signs being used in the film were repeatedly being stolen by teenagers as they had the word "magic" on them. Multiple signs had to be ordered, at £3 each. The magic shield competition takes place in Jersey, but the filming for these was done in Skegness.

Reception

Box office
The film opened on 251 screens on 18 May 2007, grossing £366,188 in its first weekend - a sum described as "healthy" but "low-key" by Variety. Overall it charted fairly poorly at the box office, generating £154,822 in its second week, placing it sixth at the British box office, before dropping to 20th with £25,404 the following week, and to 32nd with $3,766 the next, before dropping out of the chart. Its total gross was £885,174.

Critical response
The film received mixed reviews. Empire reviewer Olly Richards gave Magicians three stars, concluding that "The bumbling charms of the stars just about pull this through, but there'll be few calls for an encore come the final curtain." Derek Malcolm said that Mitchell and Webb "don't exactly cover themselves with glory in their first feature film. But they just about reach par." Going to describe the film as a "bit of a mess", although it "raises a few laughs". Alison Rowat called Magicians "an hour of OK telly trying to pass as a film", and gave it two stars. This assessment was shared by Leslie Felperin of Variety, who saw it as an "attenuated TV episode", with only "mildly amusing results", that was not as funny as Peep Show. Stuart McGurk gave a negative review, citing that "for a much-anticipated film, this is a huge let-down", and that it lacks "the eclectic off-key cruelty and spot-on zingers of the much-revered Peep Show", although he did say that the film "still has the odd good line", but concluded by saying that anyone "expecting anything else will be sorely disappointed". The Guardian's Phelim O'Neill gave Magicians two stars, calling it "Peep Show the sequel", and stated that "O'Connor's direction has absolutely zero visual flair, making the performers' transition from television to film rather pointless." The Times' Dominic Maxwell decided that "Magicians doesn't have the brio (or great gags), let alone the marketability, of a Bridget Jones." Caroline Westbrook gave the film three stars, and gave it an even review, stating that "There's a lot to like about Magicians, especially if you're a fan of Mitchell and Webb", although it "ultimately feels as though it's lacking something". She concluded that "It's a perfectly agreeable way to while away an hour and a half - but don't expect to remember much about it in the morning." Digital Spy gave the film a positive review, and three stars concluding that "A must for magic and Peep Show fans alike, with some original and brilliant comedy moments."

References

External links

 

2007 films
British comedy films
2007 comedy films
Films about magic and magicians
2000s English-language films
2000s British films